= Turići, Travnik =

Turići
- Village
- Location within Bosnia and Herzegovina
- Coordinates: 44.2315907°N 17.5863712°E
- Country: Bosnia and Herzegovina
- Entity: Federation of Bosnia and Herzegovina
- Canton: Central Bosnia
- Municipality: Travnik

Area
  - Total: 1.08 sq mi (2.81 km^{2})

Population (2013)
  - Total: 650
  - Density: 600/sq mi (230/km^{2})
- Time zone: UTC+1 (CET)
  - Summer (DST): UTC+2 (CEST)

Turići is a village in the municipality of Travnik, Bosnia and Herzegovina.

== Demographics ==
According to the 2013 census, its population was 650.

Ethnicity in 2013
Ethnicity	Number	Percentage
Bosniaks	378	58.2%
Croats	261	40.2%
other/undeclared	11	1.7%
Total	650	100%
